The solo discography of Japanese musician Yui consists of five studio albums, three compilation albums, twenty-one singles and five video albums. These were released on independent label Leaflet Records in 2004, followed by Sony Music Entertainment Japan sub-label Gr8! Records in 2005, Sony Records between 2005 and 2006, Sony sub-label Studioseven Recordings between 2007 and 2010, before returning to Gr8! Records in 2010.

Studio albums

Mini-albums

Compilation albums

Singles

Promotional singles

Video albums

Live concerts

Music video compilations

Documentaries

Music videos

Other appearances

Notes

References

Discographies of Japanese artists
Pop music discographies
Rock music discographies